José Moreno may refer to:

 José Manuel Moreno (cyclist) (born 1969), Spanish cyclist and Olympic Champion
 José Moreno Mora (born 1981), Colombian football player
 José Manuel Moreno (1916–1978), nicknamed "El Charro", Argentine football player
 José Moreno (Ecuadorian footballer)
 José Moreno (baseball) (1957–2019), former Major League Baseball infielder
 José Moreno (tennis), Spanish former tennis player
 Jose Moreno, former NFL Europa punter with Berlin Thunder
 Walter José Moreno (born 1978), Colombian football player
 Pitoy Moreno or Jose “Pitoy” Moreno, Filipino fashion designer
 José Elías Moreno (1910–1969), Mexican character actor
 José María Moreno (born 1951), Spanish poet, translator, and teacher
 José Miguel Moreno (born 1946), Spanish specialist of historical plucked string instruments
 José Moreno Sánchez (born 1993), Spanish cyclist
 José Moreno (weightlifter) (born 1980), Colombian weightlifter; see 2001 World Weightlifting Championships – Men's 85 kg

See also
Pepe Moreno (disambiguation)